Fanny was a  merchant ship built at Calcutta, British India, in 1829. She made one voyage transporting convicts from England to Australia. She was still sailing in 1839.

Career
Fanny first appeared in Lloyd's Register (LR) in 1832 with Currie, master, M'Killop, owner, and trade London–New South Wales.

Under the command of Henry Sherwood and surgeons Francis Logan and William Marshall, she departed The Downs on 29 July 1832 and arrived in Sydney on 2 February 1833. She embarked 106 female convicts, eight of whom died en route.

Citations and references
Citations

References
 
 

1829 ships
British ships built in India
Convict ships to New South Wales
Age of Sail merchant ships